= Surukot =

Coordinates: 33°10′2″N 74°58′22″E

Surukot is a place in Gool Gulabgarh tehsil of Reasi district in Jammu and Kashmir.
